Kalista is a village in southwestern Bulgaria.  Kalista is located within the jurisdiction of the nearby city Radomir, Pernik Province.  Kalista has an active railway station.  The public school hosts students from Kalista as well as nearby villages.  Since 1990, Kalista has seen its population decline.  Young people are leaving the village in pursuit of jobs in nearby large cities. 

Villages in Pernik Province